Fossato may refer to:

 Fossato Serralta, village and comune in the province of Catanzaro, in the Calabria region of southern Italy
 Fossato di Vico, town and comune of Umbria in the province of Perugia in Italy

See also 

 Fossa (disambiguation)